Apatelodes olaus is a moth in the family Apatelodidae. It is found in Argentina.

References

External links
Natural History Museum Lepidoptera generic names catalog

Apatelodidae
Moths described in 1924